Külli Palmsaar (born 1 October 1966) is an Estonian Actor.

Early life and education 
Palmsaar was born in Tallinn, Estonia, on 1 October 1966 and graduated from the Tallinn State Conservatory (now, the Estonian Academy of Music and Theatre) in 1988. Among her graduating classmates were actors Dajan Ahmet, Epp Eespäev, Merle Jääger, Piret Kalda, Elmo Nüganen, Anne Reemann, Rain Simmul, Artur Talvik, Hendrik Toompere Jr. and Raivo E. Tamm.

Career 
Palmsaar worked as an announcer for the Eesti Televisioon from 1989 to 1996. She performed theatre roles in multiple venues including the Estonian National Puppet Theatre, Rakvere Theatre, Tallinn City Theatre, Estonian Drama Theatre and Theater der Nacht. In 2009, she co-founded the First Hand Theatre with Danish puppeteer Hans Hartvich-Madsen.     

Palmsaar also starred in films and TV series such as Õnne 13 , Kättemaksukontor, Saladused, Härra Lapsti lasteteater, Ühikarotid, Parim enne, Viimane võmm and Vidiots TV.

Filmography 
 1985 The Gang (feature film)
 1984 Karoliine's Silver Yarn (feature film)
 1990 Regina (feature film)
 1993 Hysteria (feature film, Finland)
 1993 Darkness in Tallinn (feature film)
 2010 The Snow Queen (feature film)
 2012  Dorm Rats: Sisters (TV series)
 2014 Free (student film)
 2014 Do svidaniya mama (feature film, Russia)
 2018 True (short feature film)
 2018 The Little Comrade (feature film)
 2020 Tenet

References 

1966 births
Living people
Estonian stage actresses
Estonian film actresses
Estonian television actresses
Estonian television presenters
Estonian Academy of Music and Theatre alumni
Academic staff of the Estonian Academy of Music and Theatre
20th-century Estonian actresses
21st-century Estonian actresses
Actresses from Tallinn